Bachelor of Philosophy (BPhil, BPh, or PhB;  or ) is the title of an academic degree that usually involves considerable research, either through a thesis or supervised research projects. Unlike many other bachelor's degrees, the BPhil is typically a postgraduate degree awarded to individuals who have already completed a traditional undergraduate degree.

In China, the Bachelor of Philosophy is one of the twelve statutory types of bachelor's degrees. It is awarded to students who have completed an undergraduate program with a major in Philosophy, Critical Thinking, or Religious Studies.

University of Oxford

The BPhil's earliest form was as a University of Oxford graduate degree, first awarded in 1682.  Originally, Oxford named its pre-doctoral graduate degrees  two: the Bachelor as either the Bachelor of Philosophy (BPhil) or the Bachelor of Letters (BLitt).  The BPhil was a two-year degree plan partly taught and completed through research requirements.  The BLitt was a two-year research degree.  After complaints, especially from overseas students, that this naming convention often meant that graduate degrees were not being recognised as such, the university renamed them Master of Philosophy (MPhil) and Master of Letters (MLitt).  However, the Philosophy Faculty (then a sub-faculty) argued that its BPhil degree had become so well-known and respected in the philosophical world that it would be confusing to change the name. In philosophy, therefore, the degree continues to be called the BPhil. Those who pass the degree are given the choice of taking a BPhil or an MPhil; few if any choose the latter. (Note that Oxford also offers a number of other graduate degrees labeled as baccalaureate degrees: the law faculty's BCL; and the music faculty's BMus.)

Today's Oxford BPhil course is a two-year programme of seminars, six essays (of up to 5,000 words each) and a research thesis (max. 30,000 words). The BPhil is regarded as a very demanding degree, and an academic background in philosophy is a prerequisite for admission.

The Oxford BPhil was designed to be a preparation for teaching philosophy at university level. Today it often also provides a foundation for doctoral (DPhil or PhD) work in philosophy. Notable graduates of the BPhil include: Rosalind Hursthouse, Richard Swinburne, Daniel Dennett, Peter Singer, George Boolos, Thomas Nagel, Gerald Cohen, Patricia Churchland, Thomas Friedman, J. J. C. Smart, Galen Strawson, Cora Diamond, and Kris Kristofferson. Filmmaker Terrence Malick started a BPhil course but left without a degree after a disagreement with his adviser, Gilbert Ryle.

Other universities

Several universities have adopted the Oxford model of the BPhil as a graduate degree, either as originally intended (in a variety of academic subjects) or as it subsequently developed (in philosophy only); for example, Dharmaram Vidya Kshetram and Newcastle University.

At other universities, the term Bachelor of Philosophy refers to an undergraduate bachelor's degree. Frequently, the degree is either research-based or involves additional academic components, (e.g. independent study, interdisciplinary study, foreign language requirements, etc.). For example, at Pennsylvania State University, the BPhil program enables students to plan their own academic programs in conjunction with a faculty preceptor. At Miami University's Western College Program, BPhil candidates participate in a residential program, worked with faculty to design individualized majors, and produce a thesis. At the undergraduate Honors College of the University of Pittsburgh, BPhil candidates must pass oral examinations of a senior thesis. Northwestern University's BPhil degree requires two years of a foreign language. The University of Birmingham offers the BPhil as a taught, research-based undergraduate degree in the fields of education and counselling. The University of New Brunswick offers the BPhil as a seminar-based degree in interdisciplinary leadership. St. John's Seminary (Massachusetts) offers the BPhil degree upon completion of its two-year pre-theologate program, (for men studying for the Roman Catholic priesthood). The Technical University of Kenya offers the BPhil to those with higher diplomas in various subjects. Stellenbosch University offers a BPhil in journalism & Philosophy Prospective students must have obtained a recognised undergraduate degree in any discipline and sat for the department's entrance examination, which is written across South Africa. Top-performing applicants are then invited to interview for final selection. The BPhil is regarded as one of the most sought after and demanding postgraduate offerings at the university.

In 1948 the University of Chicago offered a PhB which differed from the BA in that it required two fewer non-required courses. The degree was offered by the college as part of the Hutchins program that allowed students to matriculate after two years of high school. Yale College has historically offered PhB programs.

Australia

Australian National University
The Bachelor of Philosophy (PhB) is an individually tailored, research-based undergraduate degree in arts/social sciences or the natural sciences. Students undertake supervised research courses, entitled Advanced Studies Courses, each semester with researching academics, often on a one-to-one basis. Admission is open to the top one per cent of school-leavers (ATAR 99.00 or greater). The duration of the program is four years, including an honours year, where a research thesis is undertaken. In order to graduate with the degree, students are required to maintain a high distinction average (80 per cent and above) across all courses in each semester of the degree and must complete the honours year with first-class honours.

Macquarie University
The first year of Macquarie University's Master of Research program is referred to as a Bachelor of Philosophy.

University of Western Australia
The University of Western Australia also offers the Bachelor of Philosophy (BPhil) course for high-achieving new students. This is a research intensive degree which takes four years including an honours year and a research placement unit in second or third year. Students studying the course choose disciplines from any of the bachelor's degrees. Places are very limited with on average only about 30 places offered to students each year. Thus there is a lot of competition for places and the cut-off admission rank is very high.

University of Tasmania
The Bachelor of Philosophy (BPhil) is an intellectually challenging, high impact award that provides academic extension, personal development, and recognition for experiences outside the traditional degree structure, and it is available to students who are undertaking, or have undertaken, another undergraduate degree. Enrolment in the degree is limited to high achieving students who are deemed to be capable of successfully completing additional study alongside their principal degree. The BPhil is not offered as a standalone degree at UTAS and can only be completed concurrent with, or after completion of a principal undergraduate degree and entrants must have an ATAR above 90 or a current GPA above 5.5.

References

External links
 University of Pittsburgh Honors College
 Oxford University Graduate Studies Prospectus: Philosophy
 Pennsylvania State University
 Northwestern University
 Australian National University
 Dharmaram Vidya Kshetram
 University of Newcastle upon Tyne
 University of Birmingham
 University of New Brunswick
 Stellenbosch University

Academic courses at the University of Oxford
Philosophy, Bachelor of